Shah Asad [(Sindhi: شاھ اسد), 15 August 1947 -  29 November 2005] was a film producer, director, actor and poet of Sindhi language. He directed and produced a number of Sindhi language films and also acted in some films.

Biography 
Shah Asad was born on 15 August 1947 at Tando Adam, District Sangher, Sindh, Pakistan. He passed matriculation examination from Shah Latif High School Tando Adam. His father's name was Syed Quduratullah Shah who was a spiritual leader and had a lot of followers.

Shah Asad's maternal uncle Moosa Kaleem was a poet and lyrist. Shah Asad was very close to his maternal uncle and was highly inspired by his poetry. He had also interest in acting since childhood.

He started his career as a director and writer of stage dramas. His first stage drama was Dodo Chanessar. This drama was staged in his native city Tando Adam in 1970. He penned down more than 50 stage dramas.

Moosa Kaleem introduced him in Sindhi Cinema circles as a poet. Shah Asad started his career as a writer in 1970 with Sindhi language film Rang Mahal.  He then wrote lyrics and dialogues for film Ghairat Jo Suwal in 1974 and got considerable popularity as a poet. His lyrics were sung by a number of popular Sindhi language playback singers including Runa Laila, Mehnaz, Humaira Channa, Anwer Wistro, Ustad Muhammad Yousuf, Imam Bux Zardari, Jalal Chandio and others.

Shah Asad produced a number of films in the 1980s and 1990s. His first film as a producer was Jalal Chandio which was released in 1985. He then produced Paru Chandio in 1987. Both films were among the most successful films during the 1980s. He also successfully produced film Shaheed in 1989. The central idea of this film was the famous Hur movement against the British rule in India. He was also writer and director of this film. In 1990, he produced and directed film Jeay Latil. He was also lyrist of this film. Shah Asad was screenplay writer and director of film Muhib Sheedi which was produced by Syed Yar Muhammad Shah in 1992. He also produced Telefilms Shagird, Bhutto Zindah Aahay, Shaman Mirali and Man Aashiq Tunhinjo Aanhiyan.

Shah Asad was also a story writer and his stories are published in the book titled Dil Aeen Dharti (The Heart and Homeland)

He died on 29 November 2005. He was buried in Ismail Shah graveyard of Tando Adam.

References 

1947 births
2005 deaths
 Sindhi people
 Pakistani film producers
 Pakistani film directors